{{Infobox video game
| title = Taiko: Drum Master
| collapsible = 
| state = 
| image = Taiko Drum Master PS2 US front 400px.jpg
| image_size = 250px
| caption = PS2 US front cover
| developer = Namco
| publisher = Namco
| series = Taiko no Tatsujin
| engine = 
| released = PlayStation 2| genre = Music/Rhythm
| modes = 1-2 Players
| platforms = PlayStation 2
}}Taiko: Drum Master, also known as Taiko no Tatsujin: Taiko Drum Master (太鼓の達人 TAIKO DRUM MASTER) in Japan, is a rhythm game developed and published by Namco for the Sony PlayStation 2 as part of the popular Japanese video game franchise Taiko no Tatsujin. It was released in North America in 2004, and Japan in 2005.

The game was notable for being the only Taiko no Tatsujin title to release in North America, until the releases of Taiko no Tatsujin: Drum 'n' Fun! and Taiko no Tatsujin: Drum Session! in 2018. The songs featured in Taiko: Drum Master were all in English and mostly taken from various Western artists, even in the Japanese release.

Gameplay
Symbols moving horizontally along a timeline show what to hit and when. Home versions distinguish single and double strikes, unlike the arcade versions of this franchise which register hard and soft strikes. A drum simulating the taiko is played in time with music.

Successful play builds up a life meter. If the meter is past a certain point by the end of the song, the song is passed.

In the Japanese version, subtitles under the symbols give the pronunciation of the sounds (e.g. "do don do don") using a traditional system called kuchi shoga (口唱歌).

Despite the game's appearance, players may find the game challenging to master. Players need to accomplish at least a 65% clearance of a song which is determined by the tamashi gauge to pass, and can become challenging on harder difficulties as players progress.

North American release track listing
Pop and rock
"ABC" by The Jackson Five
"American Girls" - by Counting Crows
"Are You Gonna Be My Girl" - by Jet
"Girls and Boys" - by Good Charlotte
"I'm a Believer" - by The Monkees
"Killer Queen" - by Queen
"Lady Marmalade" - by Labelle
"Love Shack" - by The B-52s
"Material Girl" - by Madonna
"My Sharona" - by The Knack 
"Slide" - by The Goo Goo Dolls
"That's the Way (I Like It)" - by KC and the Sunshine Band
"The Impression That I Get" - by The Mighty Mighty Bosstones
"Toxic" - by Britney Spears
"Tubthumping" - by Chumbawamba
"Walking on Sunshine" - by Katrina and the Waves

Anime/TV
"Dragon Ball Z Theme" (Rock the Dragon) - by Shuki Levy 
"Jimmy Neutron Theme" - by Bowling for Soup

Classical
"Beethoven's Symphony No. 5" (Beethoven)
"Carmen Prelude" (Bizet)
"Foster's Medley" (a medley of songs by Foster including "Oh! Susannah", "Kentucky Home", and "Camptown Races")
"Hungarian Dances No. 5" (Brahms)
"Symphony No. 25 in G Minor" (Mozart)
"William Tell Overture" (Rossini)

NAMCO Original
"Don Rangers" (heard in a small portion from a cutscene in Katamari Damacy) (10 crowns to unlock)
"Brave Sword, Braver Soul" (from the arcade fighting game Soulcalibur II)
"Dragon Spirit" (medley of music from the Namco arcade game of the same name)
"Katamari on the Rocks" (theme song from the PlayStation 2 game Katamari Damacy)
"Ridge Racer" (from the Namco racing game of the same name) (15 crowns to unlock)
"Taiko March" (combination of several songs from Namco titles including Sky Kid, The Tower of Druaga, and The Legend of Valkyrie) (5 crowns to unlock)
"The Genji and the Heike Clans" (from the Japanese arcade game Genpei Tōma Den) (20 crowns to unlock)

Japanese release track listing
Pop
I'm A Slave 4 U - Britney Spears
I Was Born To Love You	- Queen
American Girls	- Counting Crows
We Will Rock You - Queen
ABC - Jackson 5
Girls and Boys - by Good Charlotte
Killer Queen - Queen
The Impression That I Get - The Mighty Mighty Bosstones	
That's The Way (I Like It) - KC & The Sunshine Band	
The Loco-Motion - Carole King
Slide 
September - Earth, Wind, & Fire
"Tubthumping" - by Chumbawamba
Material Girl - Madonna
You Can't Hurry Love
Love Shack" - by The B-52s
"Lady Marmalade" - by Labelle
Walking on Sunshine - by Katrina and the Waves

Children's Song
Alphabet Song

Classical
"Beethoven's Symphony No. 5" (Beethoven)
"Carmen Prelude" (Bizet)
"Foster's Medley" (A medley of songs by Foster including Oh! Susannah, Kentucky Home, and Camptown Races)
"Hungarian Dances No. 5" (Brahms)
"Symphony No. 25 in G Minor" (Mozart)
"William Tell Overture" (Rossini)

NAMCO Original
 Brave Sword, Braver Soul
 The Genji and the Heike Clans
 Ridge Racer
 Taiko March
 Mojipittan Medley (a medley of songs from the Namco game of the same name)
 Dragon Spirit
 Saitama 2000

Bonus
 The bundle with the game comes with a Taiko controller with plastic drumsticks where players plug into the PS2 console.
 The Oni (Extreme) difficulty is unlocked by clearing 25 songs.

Reception

The PlayStation 2 version of Taiko: Drum Master received "generally favorable reviews" according to the review aggregation website Metacritic.

See also
 Taiko no Tatsujin''

References

External links
 

2004 video games
Arcade video games
Mobile games
Namco games
PlayStation 2 games
Taiko no Tatsujin
Video games developed in Japan
Multiplayer and single-player video games